Tauno Kovanen (20 June 1917 – 9 February 1986) was a Finnish wrestler. He was born in Kuru. He won an Olympic bronze medal in Greco-Roman wrestling in 1952.

Kovanen was a policeman by profession.

References

External links

1917 births
1986 deaths
People from Ylöjärvi
Olympic wrestlers of Finland
Wrestlers at the 1952 Summer Olympics
Finnish male sport wrestlers
Olympic bronze medalists for Finland
Olympic medalists in wrestling
Medalists at the 1952 Summer Olympics
Sportspeople from Pirkanmaa
20th-century Finnish people